Kamal Ganzouri (‎; 12 January 1933 – 31 March 2021) was an Egyptian economist who served as the Prime Minister of Egypt from 7 December 2011 to 24 July 2012. He previously served as prime minister from 1996 to 1999. He came to power in 1996 succeeding Atef Sedki, and was in turn succeeded by Atef Ebeid in 1999. He was branded Minister of the Poor and the Opposition Minister because of his way of dealing with limited income people and the opposition. Before becoming prime minister, Ganzouri served as Minister of Planning and International Cooperation. On 24 November 2011, Egypt's military rulers appointed him prime minister. He was sworn in and took office on 7 December 2011.

Early life and education
Kamal Ganzouri was born on 12 January 1933 in Garwan, a town in Bagor city in Monofia. He obtained a PhD at Michigan State University, United States and began teaching at Egyptian universities and training institutes in 1959.

Political career

Early career
Ganzouri served as a board member of the Sadat Academy for Administrative Sciences from 1962 to 1967 and became economic adviser to the Arab Bank for Economic Development in Africa in 1968. He was an adviser to the President Anwar Sadat. He was also a member of the National Specialized Councils of production, education and services. In 1974, he became undersecretary of Planning Minister and kept this until 1975. He was appointed Governor of the New Valley State in 1976 and then became Governor of the Bani Suef State in 1977 but resigned after just six months.

Minister of Planning
He was appointed director of The National Planning Institute in 1977 after resigning from Governor of Bani Suef State. After Hosni Mubarak assumed power as President of Egypt in 1981, Ganzouri became Minister of Planning after one year in 1982. In June 1984, he became Minister of International Cooperation. He was also Deputy Prime Minister from November 1986 to January 1996.

First premiership
On 2 January 1996, Hosni Mubarak appointed Ganzouri as a replacement of Atef Sedki. During his appointment, in what was to be known as his firsr cabinet, he operated at a level that was unprecedented in Egypt's modern history. In about 4 years or less they declared 387 laws, 57 of those made dramatic changes to Egypt. He started his Prime Ministry with 4 major projects that were supposed to help move Egypt from the valley of the River Nile by developing and reclaiming new lands to live in away from the river Nile valley. His speciality in Planning enabled him to make a plan of development for Egypt up to 2017. He improved Egypt's relations with the International Bank through the International Monetary Fund by completing the only program ever completed between Egypt and the International Bank since 1961. 13 other programs had gone to nowhere back then. The poverty ratio was reduced from 21% to 17%. Many of his proposed projects were abandoned after he was dismissed as prime minister on 5 October 1999.

Life after first term as prime minister 

Following his dismissal, he stayed completely away from the media. Some regime officials kept saying he didn't do any good to the country, and so his 20-year plan vanished while the 4 projects were neglected by the new cabinet. Even though, he had a good reputation among the people of Egypt and that was because of the major changes he had accomplished.

Support for the 2011 Egyptian revolution 
Ganzouri then appeared for the first time in about 11 years of silence as the Egyptian Revolution broke and right after Hosni Mubarak stepped down in a phone call on "Al Haya Al Youm" television program saying that's a day of a new era in Egypt and that there is no going back from this day.

He then reappeared in "Al Ashera Masa'a" TV program as his first dedicated interview after resurfacing. He started it with condolences to the protestors who died during the Egyptian Revolution, and stated that he was ready to be judged for whatever actions he took that damaged Egypt.

He was later interviewed on Almasry Alyoum where he was asked if he would nominate himself for the Presidency of Egypt, but declined to answer saying that would be the people's choice to make.

Possible presidential candidacy 

Immediately following his appearance on television, pages and groups on Facebook emerged supporting him for presidency. They grouped up and had an official page for Media outreach. Involvec parties therein expected to meet him and discuss his nomination. New Wafd Party sources were said to be thinking of backing him up as their own nominee. Nevertheless, he already had a big sector of people who supported him from the old days especially the limited income sector which is a big sector in Egypt's population. He mentioned nothing official after his last television appearance but he had some appearances in the press answering some corruption cases and investigations which were undertaken by his Cabinet that he did not approve of.

Second premiership
After Essam Sharaf resigned as Prime Minister of Egypt on 21 November 2011, Supreme Council of the Armed Forces appointed Ganzouri to form a new coalition government on 24 November. He formed his "Salvation Government" (Second Ganzouri Cabinet) on 3 December 2011 and was sworn in on 7 December. The military leadership stated as the cabinet was being sworn in that it has transferred all presidential powers to him, with the exception of affairs related to the judiciary and the military. His government resigned on 26 June 2012 after the election of Mohamed Morsi as President of Egypt to make way for the new government.

Personal life and death
Ganzouri was married and had three daughters (Suzanne, Magda and Mona).

Ganzouri died on 31 March 2021. He was 88.

References

External links
Cabinet of Egypt

|-

1933 births
2021 deaths
20th-century prime ministers of Egypt
21st-century prime ministers of Egypt
National Democratic Party (Egypt) politicians
Michigan State University alumni
People from Monufia Governorate
Planning ministers of Egypt
Governors of New Valley
Governors of Beni Suef